Hillebrand is a surname, with variants such as Hillebrandt and Hillebrant:

Hillebrand
Art Hillebrand ( 1878–1941), American football player
Candîce Hillebrand, South African-born singer-songwriter
Harold Newcomb Hillebrand, (1887–1953), American Professor for literature and theatre
Homer Hillebrand (1879–1974), American baseball player
Jerry Hillebrand (born 1940) American football player
Karl Hillebrand (1829–1884), German author
Nikolaus Hillebrand (born 1948), German bass-baritone
Paul Hillebrand, musician
R. E. Hillebrand, baseball player
William Hillebrand (1821–1886), botanist and physician
William Francis Hillebrand (1853–1925), German-American chemist

See also
Hilbrand

German-language surnames